Trap Muzik is the second studio album by the American rapper T.I., released on August 19, 2003, by Atlantic and his newly founded record label Grand Hustle. Due to the poor sales on T.I.'s first album, I'm Serious (2001), T.I. asked for a joint venture deal with Arista Records or to be released from his contract; he was subsequently dropped from the label. In 2002, T.I. launched Grand Hustle with his longtime business partner Jason Geter and signed a new deal with Atlantic Records.

The album spawned the hit singles "24's", "Be Easy", "Rubber Band Man", and "Let's Get Away". The album features guest appearances from 8Ball & MJG, Jazze Pha, Bun B and Mac Boney. With T.I.'s longtime record producer DJ Toomp as an executive producer for this album. Trap Muzik debuted at number four on the US Billboard 200 and number two on the US Top R&B/Hip-Hop Albums, selling 110,000 copies in the first week. The album was certified platinum by the Recording Industry Association of America (RIAA).

Upon its release, Trap Muzik received generally favorable reviews from most music critics, who generally regarded it as a major improvement from I'm Serious. In 2012, Complex named the album one of the classic albums of the last decade.

Background
Due to the poor commercial reception of his debut album I'm Serious (2001), T.I. asked for a joint venture deal with Arista Records or to be released from his contract; he was subsequently dropped from Arista. He then formed his own record label, Grand Hustle Records, with his longtime business partner Jason Geter, and began releasing mixtapes with the assistance of one of his disc jockeys, DJ Drama. T.I.'s mixtapes eventually earned attention from record labels such as Warner Bros. Records, Universal Records, Epic Records, and Columbia Records. T.I. ultimately signed a joint venture deal with Atlantic Records that year.

Music

Context
In an interview with Stereogum, he explained that "It's called trap music, so you know it's gonna be dealing with all aspects of the trap. And if you don't know what the trap is, that's basically where drugs are sold. In this country, the majority of us live in a neighborhood where drugs are sold, whether we like it or not. Whether you in the trap selling dope, whether you in the trap buying dope, whether you in the trap trying to get out - whatever the case may be, I'm trying to deal with all aspects of that lifestyle." Speaking on the album, T.I. explained, "It's informative for people who don't know nothing about that side of life and wonder why somebody they know that live on that side of life act the way they do or do the things they do. So it's informative for them and maybe it can help them deal with these people, help them relate to these people, help them understand, help them to see their point of view a little better".

T.I. also said that his second album showed a different insight to the first. "It's another outlook on the trap. Before, trappin' was cool, but now trappin' ain't cool. It's necessary for some, but no, it ain't cool - even if you a hustler. All the hustlers I know - sellin' dope is the last thing they wanna do. If you a real hustler, you gon' move on to bigger and better things."

Production
Producers for the album include DJ Toomp, Benny "Dada" Tillman, Carlos "Los Vegas" Thornton, David Banner, Jazze Pha, Kanye West, Nick Fury, San "Chez" Holmes and Ryan "LiquidSound" Katz.

Release and promotion

Singles
"24's" was the first official single to be released from Trap Muzik. It entered the US Billboard Hot 100 at number 78, it charted at number 27 on the Hot R&B/Hip-Hop Songs chart, and at number 15 on the Hot Rap Tracks chart. "Be Easy" was the second official single from the album, peaking at number 55 on the Billboard Hot R&B/Hip-Hop Songs chart. The single was produced by DJ Toomp.

"Rubber Band Man" was the third official single. It charted reasonably well, peaking at number 30 on the US Billboard Hot 100. It charted at number 15 on the Hot R&B/Hip-Hop Songs chart, and at number 11 on the Hot Rap Tracks chart. David Banner's production was noted by music reviewers, particularly the ascending organ riff that has been described as "hypnotic" and "pure halftime show". The song is included in the hits collections Totally Hits 2004, Crunk Hits Volume 1, and Hip Hop Hits Volume 9. T.I. says the song's title is a reference to his habit of wearing rubber bands around his wrist, a habit that dates back to when he was a drug dealer. Publicity efforts for the single were derailed by T.I.'s arrest in August 2003.

"Let's Get Away" was the fourth and final official single from the album. It entered the Billboard Hot 100 at number 35, it charted at number 17 on the Hot R&B/Hip-Hop Songs chart, at number ten on the Hot Rap Songs chart, and at number 16 on the Rhythmic Top 40.

Critical reception

Trap Muzik was well received. The AllMusic editor, Andy Kellman, wrote that with Trap Muzik, the "promise T.I. showed on his flawed debut is almost fully realized". Vibes Damien Lemon found that the album's best tracks showcase T.I. rapping unaccompanied, citing "Be Easy" and "T.I. vs. T.I.P." as highlights. Jon Caramanica of Rolling Stone described T.I. as "a hustler with a conscience and a heart" and a "limber linguist... at his best when he's dissecting the minutiae of the game." Raymond Fiore of Entertainment Weekly was more critical, finding his flow and lyrics to be ordinary except on tracks where he "breaks from his static Southern comfort zone".

In 2010, Rhapsody included Trap Muzik in its guide to "coke rap" albums.

Commercial performance
Trap Muzik was a commercial success. It debuted at number four on the US Billboard 200 and number two on the Top R&B/Hip-Hop Albums, selling 110,000 copies on its first week. On June 1, 2007, the album was certified platinum by the Recording Industry Association of America (RIAA), for sales of over a million copies in the United States.

Track listing

 Notes
 "Be Easy" contains a samples of "Somebody To Love" by Al Wilson[?]
 "No More Talk" contains a samples of "Can't Find The Judge" by Gary Wright
 "Doin' My Job" contains a samples of "I'm Just Doin My Job" by Bloodstone
 "Let's Get Away" contains a samples of "Day Dreaming" by Aretha Franklin
 "I Still Luv You" contains a samples of "She Only A Woman" by The O'Jays
 "Let Me Tell You Something" contains a samples of "I Want to Be Your Man" by Zapp & Roger

Personnel
Credits for Trap Muzik adapted from Allmusic.

 Bosko – talk box
 Leslie Brathwaite – mixing
 Mike Caren – A&R, editing
 Lavell Crump – producer
 Mike Davis – assistant engineer
 Christina Dittmar – art direction
 DJ Toomp – executive producer, producer
 Steve Fisher – engineer, mixing assistant
 Fury – producer
 Brian Gardner – mastering
 Jason Geter – executive producer, management
 Mark "Exit" Goodchild – engineer
 Vance Hornbuckle – assistant engineer
 Jazze Pha – producer, Vocals
 Kevin Knight – photography
 James Lopez – marketing
 Craig Love – guitar
 Mac Boney – performer

 Manny Marraquin – mixing
 Chris Morris – artist co-ordination
 Benjamin Niles – art direction, design
 Charles Pettaway – bass guitar, guitar
 Dale Ramsey – mixing
 Dale "Rambro" Ramsey – mixing
 Daniel Romero – mixing
 T.I. – executive producer
 Guion Thomas – assistant engineer
 Ryan Katz – producer
 Carlos Thornton – producer
 Benny Tillman – producer
 Kanye West – producer
 Howard White – assistant engineer
 Cory Williams – engineer, mixing assistant
 Crystal Williams – mixing assistant
 Mike "Hitman" Wilson – engineer
 Michael Witwer – guitar

Charts

Weekly charts

Year-end charts

Certifications

References

External links
 Rebecca Haithcoat, "What the Hell Is Trap Music (and Why Is Dubstep Involved)?", Los Angeles Weekly, October 4, 2012
 Trap Muzik at Discogs
 The Making of T.I.'s "Trap Muzik"

2003 albums
Albums produced by DJ Toomp
Albums produced by David Banner
Albums produced by Jazze Pha
Albums produced by Kanye West
T.I. albums
Atlantic Records albums
Grand Hustle Records albums